Judge Stewart may refer to:

Carl E. Stewart (born 1950), judge of the United States Court of Appeals for the Fifth Circuit
Charles E. Stewart Jr. (1916–1994), judge of the United States District Court for the Southern District of New York
Donald Stewart (Alabama politician) (born 1940), magistrate judge of the United States District Court for the Northern District of Alabama
Ted Stewart (born 1948), judge of the United States District Court for the District of Utah
William Alvah Stewart (1903–1953), judge of the United States District Court for the Western District of Pennsylvania

See also
Justice Stewart (disambiguation)